Message box may refer to:
 Pigeon-hole messagebox, a method for communicating in organizations
 Dialog box, a kind of window in graphical user interfaces